Trachyandra is a genus of plant in the family Asphodelaceae, subfamily Asphodeloideae, first described as a genus in 1843. It is native to eastern and southern Africa, as well as to Yemen and Madagascar. Many of the species are endemic to South Africa.

Species 
 Trachyandra acocksii Oberm. - Cape Province in South Africa
 Trachyandra adamsonii (Compton) Oberm. - Cape Province, Namibia
 Trachyandra affinis Kunth - Cape Province, KwaZulu-Natal
 Trachyandra arenicola J.C.Manning & Goldblatt  - Cape Province
 Trachyandra aridimontana J.C.Manning - Cape Province
 Trachyandra arvensis (Schinz) Oberm. - Angola, Zambia, Zimbabwe, Botswana, Namibia 
 Trachyandra asperata Kunth - South Africa, Lesotho, Eswatini
 Trachyandra brachypoda (Baker) Oberm. - Cape Province
 Trachyandra bulbinifolia (Dinter) Oberm. - Cape Province, Namibia
 Trachyandra burkei (Baker) Oberm. - Botswana, Limpopo, Free State, Cape Province
 Trachyandra capillata (Poelln.) Oberm. - KwaZulu-Natal
 Trachyandra chlamydophylla (Baker) Oberm. - Cape Province
 Trachyandra ciliata (L.f.) Kunth - Cape Province, Namibia
 Trachyandra dissecta Oberm. - Cape Province
 Trachyandra divaricata (Jacq.) Kunth - Cape Province; naturalized in Australia
 Trachyandra ensifolia (Sölch) Roessler - Namibia
 Trachyandra erythrorrhiza (Conrath) Oberm. - Gauteng
 Trachyandra esterhuysenae Oberm. - Cape Province
 Trachyandra falcata (L.f.) Kunth - Cape Province, Namibia
 Trachyandra filiformis (Aiton) Oberm. - Cape Province
 Trachyandra flexifolia (L.f.) Kunth - Cape Province
 Trachyandra gerrardii (Baker) Oberm. - Eswatini, South Africa
 Trachyandra giffenii (F.M.Leight.) Oberm. - Cape Province
 Trachyandra glandulosa (Dinter) Oberm. - Namibia
 Trachyandra gracilenta Oberm. - Cape Province
 Trachyandra hantamensis Boatwr. & J.C.Manning - Cape Province
 Trachyandra hirsuta (Thunb.) Kunth - Cape Province
 Trachyandra hirsutiflora (Adamson) Oberm. - Cape Province
 Trachyandra hispida (L.) Kunth - Cape Province
 Trachyandra involucrata (Baker) Oberm. - Cape Province
 Trachyandra jacquiniana (Schult. & Schult.f.) Oberm. - Cape Province
 Trachyandra kamiesbergensis Boatwr. & J.C.Manning - Cape Province
 Trachyandra karrooica Oberm. - Cape Province, Namibia
 Trachyandra lanata (Dinter) Oberm. - Namibia
 Trachyandra laxa (N.E.Br.) Oberm. - South Africa, Namibia, Botswana
 Trachyandra malosana (Baker) Oberm. - Malawi to Zimbabwe
 Trachyandra mandrarensis (H.Perrier) Marais & Reilly - Madagascar
 Trachyandra margaretae Oberm. - Mpumalanga, KwaZulu-Natal
 Trachyandra montana J.C.Manning & Goldblatt - Cape Province
 Trachyandra muricata (L.f.) Kunth - Cape Province, Namibia
 Trachyandra oligotricha (Baker) Oberm. - Cape Province
 Trachyandra paniculata Oberm. - Cape Province
 Trachyandra patens Oberm. - Cape Province
 Trachyandra peculiaris (Dinter) Oberm. - Namibia
 Trachyandra prolifera P.L.Perry - Cape Province
 Trachyandra pyrenicarpa (Welw. ex Baker) Oberm. Huíla Province in Angola
 Trachyandra revoluta (L.) Kunth - Cape Province, Namibia
 Trachyandra sabulosa (Adamson) Oberm. - Cape Province
 Trachyandra saltii (Baker) Oberm. - eastern + southern Africa from Ethiopia to Cape Province; Yemen
 Trachyandra sanguinorhiza Boatwr. & J.C.Manning - Cape Province
 Trachyandra scabra (L.f.) Kunth - Cape Province
 Trachyandra smalliana Hilliard & B.L.Burtt - Cape Province, KwaZulu-Natal
 Trachyandra tabularis (Baker) Oberm. - Cape Province
 Trachyandra thyrsoidea (Baker) Oberm. - Cape Province
 Trachyandra tortilis (Baker) Oberm. - Cape Province
 Trachyandra triquetra Thulin - Somalia
 Trachyandra zebrina (Schltr. ex Poelln.) Oberm. - Cape Province

References

 
Asphodelaceae genera
Taxonomy articles created by Polbot